The Town of Sheridan Lake is a Statutory Town located in Kiowa County, Colorado, United States. The population was 88 at the 2010 census, up from 66 at the 2000 census.

A post office called "Sheridan Lake" has been in operation since 1887. The community was named after Phil Sheridan, a pioneer hunter.

Geography
Sheridan Lake is located in eastern Kiowa County at  (38.468274, -102.293155). U.S. Route 385 passes through the town, leading north  to Cheyenne Wells and south  to Granada. Colorado State Highway 96 is the town's Main Street and leads west  to Eads, the Kiowa county seat, and east  to the Kansas border.

The town is situated just to the north of the site of the small lake for which it was named. Recent aerial photos appear to indicate that the lake is mostly dried-up, with only an alkali lake bed remaining.

Demographics

As of the census of 2000, there were 66 people, 27 households, and 16 families residing in the town. The racial makeup of the town was 95.45% White, 1.52% African American, 1.52% from other races, and 1.52% from two or more races. Hispanic or Latino of any race were 4.55% of the population. Sheridan Lake is also known as "The littlest town that ever did live".

There were 27 households, out of which 25.9% had children under the age of 18 living with them, 48.1% were married couples living together, 3.7% had a female householder with no husband present, and 40.7% were non-families. 37.0% of all households were made up of individuals, and 18.5% had someone living alone who was 65 years of age or older. The average household size was 2.44 and the average family size was 3.31.

In the town, the population was spread out, with 31.8% under the age of 18, 6.1% from 18 to 24, 31.8% from 25 to 44, 21.2% from 45 to 64, and 9.1% who were 65 years of age or older. The median age was 30 years. For every 100 females, there were 112.9 males. For every 100 females age 18 and over, there were 114.3 males.

The median income for a household in the town was $23,750, and the median income for a family was $21,500. Males had a median income of $20,313 versus $8,750 for females. The per capita income for the town was $9,981. There were no families and 3.4% of the population living below the poverty line, including no under eighteens and none of those over 64.

See also

Outline of Colorado
Index of Colorado-related articles
State of Colorado
Colorado cities and towns
Colorado municipalities
Colorado counties
Kiowa County, Colorado

References

External links

Town of Sheridan Lake
CDOT map of the Town of Sheridan Lake

Towns in Kiowa County, Colorado
Towns in Colorado